Svetlana Kuzmina (born 18 June 1969) is a retired Soviet breaststroke swimmer who won two medals in the 4 × 100 m medley relay at the 1985 and 1987 European Aquatics Championships. She also competed in the 100 m and 200 m breaststroke at the 1988 Summer Olympics, but did not reach the finals. She won a gold medal in the 200 m breaststroke at the 1991 Summer Universiade.

After retirement, she competed for Lada, Tolyatti in the masters category in the 2000s.

References

External links
Profile at Infosport.ru 

1969 births
Living people
People from Novokuybyshevsk
Swimmers at the 1988 Summer Olympics
Russian female breaststroke swimmers
Olympic swimmers of the Soviet Union
European Aquatics Championships medalists in swimming
Universiade medalists in swimming
Universiade gold medalists for the Soviet Union
Medalists at the 1991 Summer Universiade
Soviet female swimmers
Sportspeople from Samara Oblast